The 1999 Copa CONMEBOL Finals were the final match series to decide the winner of the 1999 Copa CONMEBOL, a continental cup competition organised by CONMEBOL. The final was contested by Argentine club Talleres de Córdoba and Brazilian CSA. This would also be the last edition of this trophy, which was discontinued after that.

Played under a two-legged tie system, CSA won the first leg held in Estádio Rei Pelé in Maceió, while Talleres won the second leg at Estadio Olímpico in Córdoba. Talleres won 5–4 on aggregate, achieving their first international title. That achievement is highly regarded to be not only the only international title for Talleres but for any team from Córdoba Province.

Qualified teams

Venues

Road to the final 

Notes
 QF = quarterfinal
 SF = semifinal

Match details

First leg

Second leg

See also
 1999 Copa CONMEBOL

References

Copa CONMEBOL Finals
c
c